Mogilica may refer to:

Mogilica (river), a river of Poland

Mogilica, West Pomeranian Voivodeship, a village in Poland
Mogilica or Mogilitsa, a village in Bulgaria